Kuttavum Shikshayum may refer to:
Kuttavum Shikshayum (1976 film), a film by M. Masthan
Kuttavum Shikshayum (2021 film), a film by Rajeev Ravi